Charles Stanley Hawley (April 3, 1915 – October 2, 1992) was an American professional basketball and minor league baseball player. He also coached baseball at the junior college level at Kaskaskia College.

Basketball career
Hawley's brief professional basketball career was in the National Basketball League. In 12 career games during the 1946–47 season, Hawley played for the Detroit Gems and scored 17 points.

Minor league baseball career

Player
Hawley began playing in the minor league at age 21 as a pitcher and pitched from 1936 to 1954. He had 210 wins and 160 losses with an ERA of 3.68. His batting average for those 19 years was .263 including 28 home runs. His playing career consisted of:
 7 seasons D league – Centralia, Mattoon, Mt. Vernon, Canton/Vincennes
 3 seasons C league – Greenville, El Dorado,
 6 seasons B league – Durham, Columbia, Anniston, Texarkana, Bryan/Del Rio
 4 seasons A league – Waterloo, Albany
 4 seasons A1 league – Birmingham, Little Rock

He holds the best pitching record with Mattoon Indians in 1948 with 18 wins and ERA of 1.80. Mattoon was a charter member of the Midwest League's predecessor, the Illinois State League. The franchise moved to Keokuk after the 1957 season.

Manager
Hawley managed/played from 1947 to 1954 for:
 1947 – Centralia Cubs
 1948 – Mattoon Indians
 1949 – Mattoon Indians
 1950 – Mattoon Indians
 1951 – Mount Vernon Kings
 1952 – Canton Citizens/Vincennes Velvets
 1953 – Texarkana Bears
 1954 – Bryan/Del Rio Indians

References

External links
Baseball-reference.com - Chuck Hawley
MWLGuide.com - Baseball in Mattoon, Illinois

1915 births
1992 deaths
Albany Senators players
American men's basketball players
Anniston Rams players
Baseball players from Illinois
Basketball players from Illinois
Birmingham Barons players
Bryan/Del Rio Indians players
Centralia Cubs players
Centralia Zeros players
Columbia Reds players
Detroit Gems players
Durham Bulls players
El Dorado Lions players
Forwards (basketball)
Greenville Bucks players
Guards (basketball)
Kaskaskia Blue Devils baseball coaches
Little Rock Travelers players
Mattoon Indians players
Mount Vernon Kings players
People from Marion County, Illinois
Player-coaches
Texarkana Bears players
Vincennes Velvets/Canton Citizens players
Waterloo Hawks (baseball) players